Grayson High School is located in Loganville, Georgia and has an enrollment of over 3,100 students. The school pulls students from many areas of southeastern Gwinnett County, mainly Grayson, Loganville, and Lawrenceville.

General information

Building information

Construction on the current Grayson High School building began in August 1998 and the school opened its doors in 2000. The building has 65 classrooms, but as the student body has outgrown it, expansion is required. 42 trailers were formerly located in front of the building, until an expansion of the school was completed in time for the 2021 school year. The Grayson Technical Education School extends past the main high school building and has a greenhouse and Black Box theater among many other facilities. Most recently, the Grayson Technical Education School partnered with Gwinnett Technical College to build a veterinary surgical suite. 

Grayson's main rival is Archer High School.

History

School beginnings
The original Grayson High School was established in 1913, but in 1956 the school zone merged into South Gwinnett's school district. What is left of the original two-story brick veneered building is now part of Grayson Elementary School. The bell, given to Grayson High School in 1913 as a gift from 9th District Congressman Thomas M. Bell, still stands outside of Grayson Elementary in downtown Grayson as a well-known landmark.

Plans for the new Grayson High School began in the mid-1990s to relieve the neighboring, overpopulated high schools South Gwinnett and Brookwood. A committee of educators from Gwinnett County convened to create and discuss specifications for the facility. The school officially opened in 2000.

Feeder schools

Elementary schools
 Grayson Elementary (Grayson)
 Pharr Elementary (Snellville)
 Starling Elementary (Grayson)
 Trip Elementary (Grayson)

Middle schools
 Bay Creek Middle (Grayson)
 Couch Middle (Grayson)

Notable alumni
 Eric Ati – NPSL soccer player
 Kirubel Erassa - track and field athlete
 Wayne Gallman - NFL football player
 Jon Langston - Country music singer
 Austin Meadows - MLB baseball player
 Denzel Nkemdiche - former Ole Miss football player
 Robert Nkemdiche - NFL football player

References

External links

Grayson High School
Grayson High Athletics

Public high schools in Georgia (U.S. state)
Schools in Gwinnett County, Georgia
2000 establishments in Georgia (U.S. state)
Educational institutions established in 2000